The 2022 Women's Hockey Asia Cup was the 10th edition of the Women's Hockey Asia Cup, the quadrennial international women's field hockey championship of Asia organized by the Asian Hockey Federation. It was held from 21 to 28 January 2022 at the Sultan Qaboos Sports Complex in Muscat, Oman.

The tournament was originally scheduled to be held in Bangkok, Thailand but on 29 December 2021 the tournament was moved to Muscat, Oman.

India were the defending champions. Japan won their third title after a final win over South Korea.

The top four teams qualified for the 2022 Women's FIH Hockey World Cup.

Qualified teams
The following eight teams participated in the tournament.

Preliminary round
The schedule was released on 3 January 2021.

All times are local (UTC+4).

Pool A

Pool B

Fifth to eighth place classification

Bracket

5–8th place semi-finals

Seventh place game

Fifth place game

Medal round

Bracket

Semi-finals

Third place game

Final

Final standings

Goalscorers

See also
 2022 Men's Hockey Asia Cup
 2022 Women's Indoor Hockey Asia Cup
 Field hockey at the 2022 Asian Games – Women's tournament

References

Women's Hockey Asia Cup
Asia Cup
International field hockey competitions hosted by Oman
Hockey Asia Cup
Hockey Asia Cup
21st century in Muscat, Oman
Sport in Muscat, Oman
Asia Cup